Megaplectes is a genus of parasitoid wasps belonging to the family Ichneumonidae.

The species of this genus are found in Europe and Northern America.

Species:
 Megaplectes monticola (Gravenhorst, 1829)

References

Ichneumonidae
Ichneumonidae genera